Masang Kang (also known as Masa Gang) is a mountain peak located at  in northern Bhutan.

Location 
The mountain peak is located in the catchment area of the Mo Chhu in Jigme Dorji National Park. The peak is 1.3 km south of the main Himalayan ridge, where the border between Bhutan and China runs. In its southeast, at 11.5 km Tsenda Kang  rises and in its further east, at 18.75 km Tongshanjiabu  is located. At the base, there is a trunk glacier that is 2km in length and fed by multiple tributaries.

According to SIMS data, area surrounding Masang Kang includes mafic granulites and amphibolites, a part of Great Himalayan complex of crystalline rock structure.

First ascent 
In 1985, a Japanese climbers' team from the Kyoto University Alpine Club made the first ascent. The team was splitter into three sub-teams. The first one consisted of Goro Hitomi, Toshihiro Tsukihara, Kotaro Yokoyama and Shigeki Nakayama - they reached the summit on October 13, 1985. The ascent led from the northeast spur of the mountain. The second sub-team consisted of Kozo Matsubayashi, Hironori Ito, Shinya Takeda, and Masanaru Takai - they reached the summit on the next day i.e., October 14 and finally, on October 15th the third sub-team Yasuhiko Kamizono, Hironori Ito, Koichi Nanno, and Tadao Okada reached the summit.

References 

Mountains of Bhutan
Seven-thousanders of the Himalayas